Philipp Oswald and Filip Polášek were the defending champions but chose not to defend their title.

Martín and Pablo Cuevas won the title after defeating Tristan Lamasine and Albano Olivetti 6–3, 7–6(7–2) in the final.

Seeds

Draw

References

External links
 Main draw

Open Sopra Steria de Lyon - Doubles
2021 Doubles